"Do Re Mi" (stylized in all lowercase) is a song written and performed by American hip-hop recording artist Blackbear. The original version was released on March 17, 2017, as the first promotional single from his third studio album, Digital Druglord (2017). The original version peaked at number 40 on the Billboard Hot 100.

Charts

Weekly charts

Remix featuring Gucci Mane

Year-end charts

Certifications

Release history

References

2017 songs
2017 singles
Blackbear (musician) songs
Gucci Mane songs
Songs written by Andrew Goldstein (musician)
Songs written by Gucci Mane
Songs written by Blackbear (musician)